Harlequins Women, formerly known as Harlequins Ladies, are a women's rugby union club based in Guildford, Surrey, England and in Twickenham, Middlesex, England. They were founded in 1995 as the women's team of Harlequin F.C. and rebranded in 2017 after merging with Aylesford Bulls. In 2017, they were selected as one of the franchises for the new Premier 15s league, but they also cater for new, aspiring and social players within their 3rd XV squad.

History

Beginnings 
Harlequins Ladies were founded in 1995 as the women's team of Harlequin F.C. They initially played their home games at Centaurs RFC, Grasshoppers RFC, Old Isleworthians RFC and at Harlequins' previous training base at Richardson Evans Memorial Playing Fields in Roehampton. They won their first league title unbeaten and were subject of a Channel 4 documentary.

In 2000, they were promoted to Rugby Football Union for Women Division 1. However, they were later relegated from top flight. Following the RFUW restructuring the leagues in 2007, Harlequins Ladies were placed in Championship 2 South East. In 2017, they competed in the National 2 South East league.

Reformation 
In 2016, Harlequins announced a partnership with Women's Premiership club Aylesford Bulls Ladies. The agreement stated that Aylesford Bulls would become a part of Harlequins and would wear their colours but initially retain their name and at first split their matches between Aylesford, Kent and Harlequins' Twickenham Stoop. However the elite squad later moved to be permanently based at Surrey Sports Park at the University of Surrey in Guildford, with the 3s maintaining their links with the local area and keeping Old Isleworthians RFC as their training and playing base. Although in 2021, Harlequins Women 3XV moved to Hampton Wick Royal Cricket Club and formed Harlequin Amateurs Women. In 2017, Harlequins Ladies were awarded a franchise for the new Women's Super League, later renamed Premier 15s. In doing so, Harlequins fully took over Aylesford Bulls Ladies with Harlequins being confirmed for the new league in a full merger and would cease using the Aylesford Bulls name.

In July 2019, they changed their name to Harlequins Women.

Record attendance 
On 10 March 2018, Harlequins Women played in front of a crowd of 4,545 spectators during a game against local rivals Richmond Women at Twickenham Stoop, establishing a record attendance for a British women's club rugby match.

The following season, on 30 March 2019, they beat their own record with an attendance of 4,837 for their last regular season league match of the Premier 15s season against Gloucester-Hartpury Women.

Ground 
Harlequins Women play their home league matches at Twickenham Stoop

In their early years they played most of their home matches at Surrey Sports Park in Guildford, Surrey. However, each season they played an increasing number of fixtures at Twickenham Stoop with four times in the 2017–18 season and a further six times in 2019–20.  For the 2023-23 season, Twickenham Stoop became their home for league matches.

On 30 August 2018, it was announced that the Harlequins Women 3rd XV squad would be playing their home matches at the brand new facilities at Grasshoppers RFC.

Current squad

The Harlequins Women squad for the 2021–22 season is:

Club staff

Coaching staff

Season summaries  

Gold background denotes championsSilver background denotes runners-upPink background denotes relegated

Club honours

Harlequins Women
Premier 15s
Champions 2020–21
Runners–Up: (2) 2017–18, 2018–19

References 

Women's rugby union teams in England
Sport in Guildford
Harlequin F.C.
Rugby clubs established in 1995